This is a list of Swedish counties by fertility rate as of 2020 according to the Statistics Sweden.

References 

Sweden, Fertility rate
Fertility